Pyramidelloides barbadensis is a species of sea snail, a marine gastropod mollusk in the family Eulimidae. The species is one of a number within the genus Pyramidelloides.

Description 
The maximum recorded shell length is 1.1 mm.

Habitat 
Minimum recorded depth is 100 m. Maximum recorded depth is 216 m.

References

External links
 To World Register of Marine Species

Eulimidae
Gastropods described in 1992